Amsinckia calycina, also known as hairy fiddleneck or yellow burweed, is a species of fiddleneck. It is native to Argentina and Chile and naturalised in Australia. It is an annual herb, growing to between 15 and 50 cm high and has pale yellow flowers. The species is poisonous to mammals.

References

calycina
Flora of Argentina
Flora of Chile